Estadio Tomás Arrieta was a baseball park in Barranquilla, Colombia.  It served as the home of the Caimanes de Barranquilla.  The stadium held 8,000 people.
The stadium was demolished and replaced by Edgar Rentería Stadium.

References 

Baseball in Colombia
Baseball venues in South America
Sports venues in Colombia
Buildings and structures in Barranquilla
Sports venues completed in 1946
1946 establishments in Colombia